Stigmella ceanothi is a moth of the family Nepticulidae. It is found in California, United States.

The wingspan is 3.2-6.6 mm. Adults are on wing in March, mid-April, mid-May and September. There are two and possibly three generations per year.

The larvae feed on Ceanothus divaricatus. They mine the leaves of their host plant. The mine consists of a narrow, much contorted, linear gallery, located on the upper surface and approximately 3 cm in length. It is almost entirely filled with evenly deposited frass.

External links
Nepticulidae of North America
A taxonomic revision of the North American species of Stigmella (Lepidoptera: Nepticulidae)

Nepticulidae
Endemic fauna of California
Moths of North America
Fauna of the California chaparral and woodlands
Moths described in 1910
Fauna without expected TNC conservation status